Sketch for a Theory of the Emotions is a 1939 book by the philosopher Jean-Paul Sartre.

Summary

Sartre analyses prior ideas, including psychoanalytic theories before presenting his own phenomenological analysis.

Editions
The Emotions: Outline of a Theory, translated by Bernard Frechtman, The Philosophical Library, 1948.

External links
Summary on the Internet Encyclopedia of Philosophy.

1939 non-fiction books
Books by Jean-Paul Sartre
Books about emotions
French non-fiction books